Copanarta is a genus of moths of the family Noctuidae. The genus was erected by Augustus Radcliffe Grote in 1895.

Species
 Copanarta aurea (Grote, 1879) (syn: Copanarta nigerrima (J. B. Smith, 1903))
 Copanarta sexpunctata (Barnes & McDunnough, 1916)

References

Cuculliinae